Chromium(III) nitrate describes several inorganic compounds consisting of chromium, nitrate and varying amounts of water. Most common is the dark violet hygroscopic solid. An anhydrous green form is also known.  Chromium(III) nitrate compounds are of a limited commercial importance, finding some applications in the dyeing industry.  It is common in academic laboratories for the synthesis of chromium coordination complexes.

Structure
The relatively complicated formula - [Cr(H2O)6](NO3)3•3H2O - betray a simple structure of this material.  The chromium centers are bound to six aquo ligands, and the remaining volume of the solid is occupied by three nitrate anions and three molecules of water of crystallization.

Properties and preparation
The anhydrous salt forms green crystals and is very soluble in water (in contrast to anhydrous chromium(III) chloride which dissolves very slowly except under special conditions). At 100 °C it decomposes. The red-violet hydrate is highly soluble in water.  Chromium nitrate is used in the production of alkali metal-free catalysts and in pickling.

Chromium nitrate can be prepared by dissolving chromium oxide in nitric acid.

References

Chromium(III) compounds
Nitrates